The pulse vaccination strategy is a method used to eradicate an epidemic by repeatedly vaccinating a group at risk, over a defined age range, until the spread of the pathogen has been stopped. It is most commonly used during measles and polio epidemics to quickly stop the spread and contain the outbreak.

Mathematical model 
Where T= time units is a constant fraction p of susceptible subjects vaccinated in a relatively short time. This yields the differential equations for the susceptible and vaccinated subjects as

Further, by setting , one obtains that the dynamics of the susceptible subjects is given by:

and that the eradication condition is:

See also 
 Critical community size
 Epidemic model
 Herd immunity
 Pulse Polio
 Ring vaccination
 Vaccine-naive

References

External links

 Immunisation Immunisation schedule for children in the UK. Published by the UK Department of Health.
 CDC.gov - 'National Immunization Program: leading the way to healthy lives', US Centers for Disease Control (CDC information on vaccinations)
 CDC.gov - Vaccines timeline
 History of Vaccines Medical education site from the College of Physicians of Philadelphia, the oldest medical professional society in the US
 Images of vaccine-preventable diseases

Vaccination
Biotechnology
Preventive medicine
Epidemiology
Global health